The Central District of Qorveh County is a district (bakhsh) in Qorveh County, Kurdistan Province, Iran. At the 2006 census, its population was 99,558, in 24,061 families. The district has two cities: Qorveh and Delbaran. The district has four rural districts (dehestan): Badr Rural District, Delbaran Rural District, Panjeh Ali Rural District, and Panjeh Ali-ye Jonubi Rural District.

References 

Qorveh County
Districts of Kurdistan Province